The Poll Winners is an album by jazz guitarist Barney Kessel with drummer Shelly Manne and bassist Ray Brown that was recorded in 1957 and released by Contemporary Records. The album was the first of five to be released by the group.

Reception

The Allmusic review by Ronnie D. Lankford, Jr. states: "The choice of material, the interplay between the three players, and the lead work all meld together beautifully on The Poll Winners, making it a classic guitar album in a small-group setting".

Track listing
 "Jordu" (Duke Jordan) - 3:27
 "Satin Doll" (Duke Ellington, Billy Strayhorn, Johnny Mercer) - 6:30
 "It Could Happen to You" (Jimmy Van Heusen, Johnny Burke) - 4:23
 "Mean to Me" (Fred E. Ahlert, Roy Turk) - 6:28
 "Don't Worry 'bout Me" (Rube Bloom, Ted Koehler) - 4:34
 "On Green Dolphin Street" (Bronisław Kaper, Ned Washington) - 4:02
 "You Go to My Head" (J. Fred Coots, Haven Gillespie) - 4:22
 "Minor Mood" (Barney Kessel) - 3:18
 "Nagasaki" (Harry Warren, Mort Dixon) - 3:05

Personnel
Barney Kessel - guitar
Ray Brown - bass
Shelly Manne - drums

References

Contemporary Records albums
Barney Kessel albums
1957 albums